Chesters may refer to:

People
 Charles Chesters (1904-1993), British botanist
 Lisa Chesters (born 1980), Australian politician

Places
 Chesters (estate), in Scotland
 Chesters (Humshaugh), a mansion located near the fort
 Chesters Roman Fort, in England
 Chesters, Southdean, a location in the Scottish Borders, Scotland

See also
Chester's, American chicken restaurant
Chester (disambiguation)